Râu Alb is a commune in Dâmbovița County, Muntenia, Romania, with 1500 inhabitants. It is composed of two villages, Râu Alb de Jos (the commune center) and Râu Alb de Sus. These were part of Bărbulețu Commune until 2004, when they were split off.

Râu Alb is about 7 km away from the town of Pucioasa, and about 40 km from Târgoviște, the county seat.  The commune has its own hospital, church and police station.

References

Communes in Dâmbovița County
Localities in Muntenia